Kåre Øvregard (born 19 February 1933 in Jostedal) is a Norwegian politician for the Labour Party.

He was elected to the Norwegian Parliament from Sogn og Fjordane in 1977, and was re-elected on two occasions.

On the local level he was deputy mayor of Jostedal municipality from 1959 to 1962. In 1963, Jostedal became a part of Luster, and Øvregard was a member of Luster municipality council from 1963 to 1977 (except for 1968, 1969 and 1970), serving as deputy mayor in 1965–1967 and mayor in 1975–1977.

Outside politics he graduated from Stord Teachers College in 1957, worked as a school teacher from 1957 to 1975 and rådmann in Luster from 1989 to 1994.

References

1933 births
Living people
Members of the Storting
Labour Party (Norway) politicians
Mayors of places in Sogn og Fjordane
20th-century Norwegian politicians
People from Luster, Norway